The Táchira helicopter crash was the loss of a Venezuela Army helicopter and its 18 occupants on 3 May 2009. The helicopter crashed at around midday local time (16.30 UTC) near El Alto de Rubio in the north-western state of Táchira in Venezuela. All eighteen people aboard the aircraft were killed. The dead included one Brigadier-General, two army pilots, fourteen other army personnel and one civilian. Venezuelan President Hugo Chávez, who was a retired army Lieutenant-Colonel, announced the incident in his weekly television broadcast and said "I pay tribute to these soldiers of the homeland, especially Gen Faneite, who was my cadet".

The cause of the crash is not yet known. It is known that the area was subject to adverse weather conditions prior to the crash. The aircraft involved was a Russian Mil Mi-35, although some news sources reported it erroneously as a Mil Mi-17.

The crash occurred just days after Colombian President Álvaro Uribe asked for Venezuelan assistance in eliminating FARC guerillas on the Venezuelan side of the border. It is not yet known if the crash is linked to intensified Venezuelan military operations against the guerillas. The United States Department of State's annual assessment of terrorism also recently criticised Venezuela for failing to police the border and stated that Colombian rebels and paramilitaries "regularly crossed into Venezuelan territory to rest and regroup as well as to extort protection money".

References 

Accidents and incidents involving helicopters
Accidents and incidents involving military aircraft
Aviation accidents and incidents in 2009
Aviation accidents and incidents in Venezuela
2009 in Venezuela
Táchira
May 2009 events in South America